Platydema is a genus of darkling beetles in the family Tenebrionidae. There are at least 60 described species in Platydema.

Species
These 67 species belong to the genus Platydema:

 Platydema alticorne Gravely, 1915 g
 Platydema americanum Laporte & Brullé, 1831 g b
 Platydema aurimaculatum Gravely, 1915 g
 Platydema bimaculatum Champion, 1886 g
 Platydema coeruleum Gebien, 1925 g
 Platydema cruentum (Perty, 1830) g
 Platydema cruentatum Laporte de Castelnau & Brullé, 1831 g
 Platydema dejeanii Laporte de Castelnau & Brullé, 1831 g
 Platydema ellipticum (Fabricius, 1798) g b
 Platydema endoi Masumoto, 1984 g
 Platydema erythrocera b
 Platydema europaeum Laporte de Castelnau & Brullé, 1831 g
 Platydema excavatum (Say, 1824) g b
 Platydema flavipes (Fabricius, 1801) b
 Platydema flavopictum Gebien, 1913 g
 Platydema fumosum g
 Platydema guatemalense Champion, 1886 g
 Platydema haemorrhoidale Gebien, 1913 g
 Platydema inquilinum b
 Platydema irradians (Chevrolat, 1877) g
 Platydema laevipes Haldeman, 1848 b
 Platydema lebomicum Schawaller, 2004 g
 Platydema marseuli Lewis, 1894 g
 Platydema micans Horn, 1870 b
 Platydema monoceros Gebien, 1925 g
 Platydema neglectum Triplehorn, 1965 g
 Platydema nigratum b
 Platydema nigricorne Laporte de Castelnau & Brullé, 1831 g
 Platydema nigrifrons Chevrolat, 1878 g
 Platydema notatum Laporte de Castelnau & Brullé, 1831 g
 Platydema obscurum Sharp, 1885 i c g
 Platydema oregonense LeConte, 1857 g b
 Platydema pallidicolle (Lewis, 1894) g
 Platydema parachalceum Masumoto, 1982 g
 Platydema picilabrum Melsheimer, 1846 b
 Platydema picipes Laporte de Castelnau & Brullé, 1831 g
 Platydema pictum (Fauvel, 1904) g
 Platydema quindecimmaculatum Chevrolat, 1878 g
 Platydema raharizoninai Ardoin, 1966 g
 Platydema rubropictum Chevrolat, 1878 g
 Platydema ruficolle b
 Platydema ruficorne (Sturm, 1826) g b
 Platydema sakishimense Nakane, 1973 g
 Platydema sauteri Gebien, 1913 g
 Platydema sawadai Masumoto, 1991 g
 Platydema sexmaculatum Chevrolat, 1878 g
 Platydema sexnotatum b
 Platydema silphoides Laporte de Castelnau & Brullé, 1831 g
 Platydema striatum (Montrouzier, 1860) g
 Platydema subcostatum Laporte & Brullé, 1831 g b
 Platydema subfasciatum (Walker, 1858) g
 Platydema sulcipenne Gebien, 1925 g
 Platydema tahitiense Kaszab, 1985 g
 Platydema takeii Nakane, 1956 g
 Platydema teleops Triplehorn, 1965 g b
 Platydema terusane Masumoto, 1984 g
 Platydema tibiale Chevrolat, 1878 g
 Platydema toyamai Masumoto & al., 2013 g
 Platydema transversum Laporte de Castelnau & Brullé, 1831 g
 Platydema triste Laporte de Castelnau & Brulle, 1831 g
 Platydema tuchinlonoi Masumoto, 1982 g
 Platydema varians Laporte de Castelnau & Brullé, 1831 g
 Platydema violaceum (Fabricius, 1790) g
 Platydema wandae Triplehorn, 1965 b
 Platydema yangmingense Masumoto, 1982 g

Data sources: i = ITIS, c = Catalogue of Life, g = GBIF, b = Bugguide.net

References

Further reading

External links

 

Tenebrionidae